Ribe is the oldest town of Denmark.

Ribe may also refer to:

Places

Denmark
Ancient Diocese of Ribe, a former Roman Catholic Diocese in Denmark
Diocese of Ribe, a diocese in the Church of Denmark
Ribe Cathedral, a Roman Catholic church in the town of Ribe
Ribe Katedralskole, a very old cathedral school in the town of Ribe
Ribe County, former county in Denmark which was abolished in 2007
Ribe Municipality, a former municipality in Denmark, now part of Esbjerg Municipality
Ribe Kunstmuseum, an art museum in the town of Ribe

Norway
Ribe, Norway, a village in Lillesand municipality in Aust-Agder county

Other
Ribe (crater), an impact crater on Mars, named after the Danish city of Ribe

People
Ribe (ethnic group), a Kenyan tribe that is part of the Mijikenda peoples
Àngels Ribé (born 1943), a Catalan conceptual artist of the 1970s
Montse Ribé (born 1972), a Spanish make-up artist and actress
Peter Ribe (born 1966), a Norwegian sprint canoer

Other
 Treaty of Ribe, a proclamation at Ribe made by King Christian I of Denmark
 RIBE CV mechanical fastener, commonly refers to the Polydrive fastener which is used in automotive products
 Radiation-induced bystander effect
RIBE short for Richard Bergner GmbH & Co. KG, German manufacturer of fastening systems, technical springs, and electrical fittings